Emamabad (also Romanized as Emāmābād; also known as Darreh Razgah and Darreh Razgeh) is a village in Armand Rural District, in the Central District of Lordegan County, Chaharmahal and Bakhtiari Province, Iran. At the 2006 census, its population was 553, in 138 families.

References 

Populated places in Lordegan County